Bulgarian Campaign may refer to:
Byzantine–Bulgarian wars (680–1355)
Bulgarian campaigns of Constantine VI (8th century)
Bulgarian campaigns of Theodore II Laskaris (11th century)
Bulgarian Campaign of World War I
Bulgaria during World War II